Christopher John Adams (born 6 May 1970) is an English former first-class cricketer who briefly represented his nation at Test and One Day International level. He is the current interim head coach of the Dutch national team.

Playing career
An aggressive right-handed batsman, occasional right-arm off spin bowler and specialist slip fielder, Adams enjoyed a successful first-class career for Derbyshire and Sussex.

Adams made his first-class debut as an eighteen-year-old for Derbyshire in one match the 1988 season and stayed there until the 1997 season, when he left to join Sussex as captain. He is the longest serving county captain in Sussex's history. He captained Sussex to the 2003, 2006 and 2007 County Championship titles, and was one of five Wisden Cricketers of the Year in 2004 for his efforts in the previous calendar year.

He had a brief career at international level for England, playing five Tests and five One-day Internationals between May 1998 and January 2000. He made his Test debut in 1999 against South Africa at Johannesburg, and came to the crease for his maiden Test innings to face Allan Donald on a hat-trick, with England in the perilous position of four wickets down for two runs; he successfully negotiated the hat-trick, but was caught behind off Donald in both innings, for 16 and 1. Failing to reproduce his domestic form, Adams averaged just 13 in Tests and 17.75 in ODIs.

In a first-class career that ran from 1988 until 2008, Adams scored 19,535 runs, with an impressive 48 centuries and a highest score of 239.

In late 2006, he agreed a four-year deal with Yorkshire to become both captain and director of professional cricket, but dramatically reversed this decision on 14 November, saying that he did not feel able to deal with such a role at this stage of his career. His change of heart left Yorkshire "shell-shocked" but Sussex "thrilled".

Adams announced he was to step down as Sussex captain on 14 September 2008, guiding Sussex to the Pro40 Division One Title the same day. He subsequently announced his retirement from first-class cricket, upon his appointment as cricket manager of Surrey County Cricket Club.

Coaching career
After taking over at Surrey in 2008 and appointing a young captain in Rory Hamilton-Brown Surrey gained promotion and won the domestic 40 over competition in 2011. He was coach when the Surrey team suffered the death of one of their young first team players Tom Maynard on 18 June 2012, on a tube line after fleeing from police who stopped his car with him four times over the alcohol limit with cocaine and MDMA in his system. Even though Maynard's housemate and captain Hamilton-Brown, who had been out with Maynard that fateful evening, left to join Sussex, questions remained about the disciplinary attitudes at the club. On 17 June 2013, it was announced by Surrey County Cricket Club that Adams had been sacked, along with his first team coach Ian Salisbury.

References

External links
 Cricinfo player profile of Chris Adams
 HowSTAT! statistical profile of Chris Adams

1970 births
Living people
Derbyshire cricketers
English cricketers
England One Day International cricketers
England Test cricketers
ACT Comets cricketers
People from Whitwell, Derbyshire
Cricketers from Derbyshire
Sussex cricket captains
Sussex cricketers
Wisden Cricketers of the Year
English cricket coaches
Coaches of the Netherlands national cricket team
English expatriate sportspeople in the Netherlands
English expatriate sportspeople in Australia
First-Class Counties Select XI cricketers